David L. Eubanks (born November 18, 1935) is an American preacher associated with the Restoration Movement of Christianity.  Eubanks was the fifth President of Johnson Bible College, serving from 1969 to 2007, which ranks him among the longest serving college presidents in the U.S.

Early life and education

Eubanks grew up in Maryville, Tennessee.  He graduated from Johnson Bible College in 1957 and later earned a Ph.D. in History from the University of Tennessee.

Johnson Bible College

Eubanks became the President of Johnson Bible College in 1969.  He held the office until resigning in 2007, but remained with the college as an advisor.  His term was marked by unprecedented admissions and campus growth.  Nine buildings were constructed and between 1997 and 2007 admissions nearly doubled.  Under Eubanks's leadership, the college received its first regional accreditation from the Southern Association of Colleges and Schools in 1979.  Graduate programs were also added during his tenure.

Other activities

David Eubanks served as the President of the 1984 North American Christian Convention in Atlanta, Georgia.

On March 22, 2013, Dr. Eubanks was named chief operating officer of Florida Christian College in order to oversee the merger between Florida Christian College and Johnson University.

References

1935 births
Heads of universities and colleges in the United States
Restoration Movement
Living people
People from Maryville, Tennessee